The Department of Industry, Technology and Commerce was an Australian government department that existed between December 1984 and March 1993.

History
The Department was created by the Hawke Government in December 1984, a substantial expansion of the previous Department of Industry and Commerce. Hawke reasoned that including responsibility for technology and civil offsets in the new Department would enable better integration of Australia's industry and technology policies and would increase the competitiveness of Australian industry stimulating growth and employment opportunities.

Scope
Information about the department's functions and/or government funding allocation could be found in the Administrative Arrangements Orders, the annual Portfolio Budget Statements and in the Department's annual reports.

According to the Administrative Arrangements Order (AAO) made on 13 December 1984, the Department dealt with:
Manufacturing and Commerce (including industries development) 
Technology and industrial research and development
Small business
Duties of customs and excise
Bounties on the production or export of goods
Offsets, to the extent not dealt with by the Department of Defence

Structure
The Department was an Australian Public Service department, staffed by officials who were responsible to the Minister for Industry, Technology and Commerce. The Minister was John Button.

From 13 December 1984 to 12 March 1985, the Secretary of the Department was Tom Hayes. Hayes left the department in 1985 to become Comptroller-General of the Australian Customs Service, which had been taken out of the department and established as a separate statutory authority.

From 13 March 1985 to 30 June 1990, the Secretary was David Charles. The third Secretary of the department was Malcolm McIntosh, from 1 July 1990 to 22 December 1990. Neville Stevens was appointed the department's fourth and final secretary in December 1990.

References

Ministries established in 1984
Industry, Technology and Commerce
1984 establishments in Australia
1993 disestablishments in Australia